Lepturopetium is a genus of Pacific Island plants in the grass family.

 Species
 Lepturopetium kuniense Morat  - New Caledonia
 Lepturopetium marshallense Fosberg & Sachet  - Marshall Islands, Mariana Islands, Cook Islands

References

Chloridoideae
Poaceae genera
Flora of the Pacific